Amalda australis, common name the southern olive, is a medium-sized sea snail, a gastropod mollusc of the family Ancillariidae. These predatory snails live in the inter-tidal sand, an environment that lends itself to high probability of fossilization. Amalda australis fossils date back to the Pliocene and reveal morphological stasis.

Distribution

This marine species is endemic to New Zealand.

References

 Sowerby G.B. I (1830). Species Conchylirum or concise original descriptions and accompanied by figures of all the species of Recent shells, with their varieties. G.B. Sowerby, London. page(s): Species 27, pl. 211, fig. 1,2
 Powell A W B, New Zealand Mollusca, William Collins Publishers Ltd, Auckland, New Zealand 1979 
 Glen Pownall, New Zealand Shells and Shellfish, Seven Seas Publishing Pty Ltd, Wellington, New Zealand 1979 
 Spencer, H.G., Marshall, B.A. & Willan, R.C. (2009). Checklist of New Zealand living Mollusca. Pp 196–219. in: Gordon, D.P. (ed.) New Zealand inventory of biodiversity. Volume one. Kingdom Animalia: Radiata, Lophotrochozoa, Deuterostomia. Canterbury University Press, Christchurch.

External links
 Reeve L.A. (1864). Monograph of the genus Ancillaria. In: Conchologia Iconica, vol. 15, pl. 1-12 and unpaginated text. L. Reeve & Co., London.

australis
Gastropods of New Zealand
Gastropods described in 1830
Taxa named by George Brettingham Sowerby I